The ScottishPower Pipe Band, is a Grade 1 pipe band sponsored by the international energy company ScottishPower.

History
Formed in 1969 as the British Caledonian Airways Pipe Band, the band won the World Pipe Band Championships (Grade 2) in 1977. By then known as the British Caledonian Airways (Gatwick) Pipe Band, the group was upgraded to Grade 1 the following year. After a change in sponsorship, the band became known as Power of Scotland (in 1989) and, finally, ScottishPower in the early 1990s.

1995 marked a new area for the band as they switched from their distinctive Ancient Caledonia kilt to the newly developed ScottishPower tartan.

The ScottishPower Pipe Band is currently led by P/M Chris Armstrong and Leading Drummer Jake Jørgensen.

Pipe Majors
Iain MacLeod (1969–1971)
John Roe (1971–1973)
Robert (Bob) Richardson (1973–1982)
Harry McNulty (1982–1992)
Hugh MacInnes (1992–1995)
Roddy MacLeod (1995–2006)
Chris Armstrong (2006-    )

Leading drummers
Davie Bruce (1975–1978)
Bob Turner (1978–1982)
Alex Duthart (1982–1986)
Eric Ward (1986–1991)
John Scullion (1991–2002)
Barry Wilson (2002–2014)
Jake Jørgensen (2014-    )

Discography
as The Pipes & Drums of British Caledonian Airways
Alba (1987) – with The BBC Scottish Symphony Orchestra

as ScottishPower Pipe Band
Tartan Weave (1995)
Cathcart (2004)
Live (2015)
Revolution (2017) – SoundCloud release

References

External links 
 

Grade 1 pipe bands
Scottish pipe bands
Musical groups from Glasgow